Tuxentius stempfferi, the Stempffer's Pierrot, is a butterfly in the family Lycaenidae. It is found in Tanzania. The species is named after French entomologist Henri Stempffer.

References

Endemic fauna of Tanzania
Butterflies described in 1976
Polyommatini